Four Eyes and Six Guns is a 1992 Western comedy film starring Judge Reinhold, Patricia Clarkson and Fred Ward. It includes guest roles by Dan Hedaya, M. Emmet Walsh, Jon Gries, Austin Pendleton and others.

Plot
Earnest Allbright (Judge Reinhold) opens his eyeglass store in what he thinks is a thriving community, but soon discovers that his store is just a shabby shack in Tombstone, Arizona. The town's Doom Brothers are trouble for everybody including Wyatt Earp (Fred Ward), the sheriff. Earnest uses his own special brand of short-sighted shooting to help Wyatt rid the town of its worst citizens and live in peace.

Cast
 Judge Reinhold as Earnest Allbright
 Patricia Clarkson as Lucy Laughton
 Fred Ward as Wyatt Earp
 John Schuck as Charlie Winniger
 Jon Gries as Deputy Elmo
 M. Emmet Walsh as Mayor Thornbush
 William Duff-Griffin as Mr. Laughton
 Jake Dengel as 'Kid' O'Banion
 Richard Grover as Jim Bryer
 Shane McCabe as Doc Wilson
 Mildred Brion as Mrs. Whitney
 Dan Hedaya as Lester Doom
 Dennis Burkley as Luke Doom
 Neal Thomas as Leroy Doom
 Billy Joe Patton as Leander Doom
 Bill Getzwiller as Len Doom
 Forry Smith as Lorne Doom
 Ann Risley as Saloon Hostess
 Walter Lipsky as Preacher
 Douglas Deane as Undertaker
 Mike Casper as Butcher
 Austin Pendleton as Mustached Passenger

External links
 

1992 films
American television films
1990s Western (genre) comedy films
American Western (genre) comedy films
Films scored by David Shire
Films set in Arizona
Cultural depictions of Wyatt Earp
1992 comedy films
1990s American films